Shetland RFC is a rugby union club based in Lerwick, Scotland. The women's side plays in the Tennent's Women's North League.

History

The club was founded in 1878 and is one of the oldest clubs in the Shetland islands. The club play at North Lochside.

Women's side

Shetland RFC run a women's side, alongside an U18s girls side. Shetland RFC Women were 2019 Tennent's Women's North League champions.

Sevens tournament

The club run an annual Sevens tournament. Billed as the most northerly Sevens tournament in Britain, it is called the May Madness tournament. 2019's event will be on 25 May.

References

Scottish rugby union teams
Lerwick
Rugby union in Shetland